Carlos Carr Brown (25 February 1882 – 12 August 1926) was an Argentine international footballer who played as a defender.

Early life
Brown was an Argentine of Scottish origin.

Brown had four brothers who were also Argentine international players – Alfredo, Eliseo, Ernesto and Jorge – as well as one cousin, Juan Domingo. Two other brothers – Diego and Tomás – were also footballers.

Career
Brown played club football for Alumni Athletic Club, and international football for the Argentina national team between 1903 and 1905 making 2 official appearances.

See also
Brown family (Argentina)

References

1882 births
1926 deaths
Argentine footballers
Association football defenders
Argentina international footballers
Argentine people of Scottish descent
Alumni Athletic Club players
Brown family (Argentina)